Samuel Pfrimmer  Hays (April 5, 1921 – November 22, 2017) was a pioneering environmental, social and political historian. Born in Corydon, Indiana and raised on a local dairy farm. He earned a graduates degree from Swarthmore College in 1948, and a Ph.D. at Harvard University. He authored multiple works including "The Response to Industrialism 1885-1914" in 1957, "Conservation and the Gospel of Efficiency," "Beauty, Health, and Permanence: Environmental Politics in the United States, 1955-1985” and "A History of Environmental Politics since 1945". He established the Archives of Industrial Society at The University of Pittsburgh where he served as a professor from 1960 until 1990.

Hays served as president of the Urban History Association in 1992. In 1997 he came the first recipient of the American Society for Environmental History Distinguished Scholar award. In 1999 he was awarded the Distinguished Service Award from the Organization of American Historians. Hayes was an environmental activist. He owned a 311-acre tract of land in Harrison County, Indiana, near Corydon, and he donated the land to the county as a nature preserve. The county operates it as the Hayswood Nature Reserve.

References

External links
Hayswood Nature Reserve
Obituary: Samuel Hays

1921 births
2017 deaths
People from Corydon, Indiana
University of Pittsburgh faculty
Swarthmore College alumni
Harvard University alumni
American historians
Environmental historians